Luco dei Marsi is a comune and town in the province of L'Aquila in the Abruzzo region of central-eastern Italy. It is part of the Marsica.

The town was probably founded by the Roman Emperor Claudius to house workers in the drying of the Lacus Fucinus (Lake Fucino). The name derives from a nearby wood, Lucus Angitiae, "Sacred Grove of Angitia," referring to a divine sorceress of the Marsi Italic tribe.

During the Middle Ages it was a fief of the d'Avalos and then of the Colonna family.

Notable people
 

 Mattia Ciccarelli ( 1481–1543),  Italian Roman Catholic professed religious

References 

 
Marsica